Carlos Alberto Vereza de Almeida (born 4 March 1939) is a Brazilian actor. He was born in Rio de Janeiro.

Selected filmography
 O Bravo Guerreiro (1968)
 Memoirs of Prison (1984)
 O Rei do Gado (1996)
 Corpo Dourado (1998)
 Midnight (1998)
 O Cravo e a Rosa (2000)
 Sítio do Picapau Amarelo (2001-2002)
 The Three Marias (2002)
 Kubanacan (2003)
 Um Só Coração (2004)
 Começar de Novo (2004)
 Sinhá Moça (2006)
 Duas Caras (2007)
 Bezerra de Menezes: O Diário de um Espírito (2008)
 Amor Eterno Amor (2012)
 Além do Tempo (2015)

References

External links

1939 births
Living people
Brazilian male film actors
Brazilian male telenovela actors
20th-century Brazilian male actors
21st-century Brazilian male actors
Male actors from Rio de Janeiro (city)